Kolbjørn Brenda (March 9, 1914 – January 15, 1988) was a Norwegian actor.

Brenda debuted in 1936 at the Søilen Theater in Oslo and was engaged there until 1939. He performed for eight years at the Falkberget Theater and two years at the Rogaland Theater, and from 1951 onward his artistic versatility made him a central figure in the ensemble at the National Traveling Theater. Among others roles, he played Jeppe in Erasmus Montanus, seven roles in Peer Gynt in the same performance, and Dr. Onsø in Nils Kjær's Det lykkelige valg (The Happy Election). Brenda's parting role was the carpenter Engstrand in Ghosts. In the 1930s he was active in Norwegian film, especially in Olav Dalgard's films. In the film To levende og en død (1937), Brenda played one of the postal workers. In 1975 he had the lead role in Streik!

Brenda received the King's Medal of Merit in gold in 1986.

Filmography
 1937: To levende og en død as a postal clerk
 1937: By og land hand i hand as Anton
 1938: Det drønner gjennom dalen as a forest worker
 1938: Lenkene brytes as the chairman
 1939: Gryr i Norden as Adolf
 1942: Trysil-Knut as a farm boy
 1949: Aldri mer!
 1949: Døden er et kjærtegn as the town bailiff
 1973: Kirsebærhaven as the station master
 1973: Miranda as a guest
 1975: Streik! as Knut Martinsen

References

External links
 
 Kolbjørn Brenda at Filmfront
 Kolbjørn Brenda at the Swedish Film Database

1914 births
1988 deaths
Norwegian male stage actors
Norwegian male film actors
20th-century Norwegian male actors
People from Elverum